A pecan log roll is a confectionery popularized by the roadside convenience store, Stuckey's.

Pecan log rolls are described by the company's website as  "fluffy, cherry-laced nougat wrapped in fresh caramel and pecans."

References

External links
Stuckey's official site

American confectionery
Cuisine of the Southern United States
Nut dishes
Candy bars
Log roll